

Geography
Macenta is the capital of the Macenta Prefecture in southeastern Guinea 
is located in the Guinea Highlands (at ) on the road from Nzérékoré to Guéckédou. The Nianda River joins the Makonda River near Macenta. Macenta is also located near the border of Liberia.

Climate
Macenta has a tropical monsoon climate (Köppen climate classification Am).

Recent history
French colonial and settlement influx influenced by Liberians circa 2000. It is the source of the 2014 African Ebola outbreak.

Economy
Macenta is the major trading market town for tea, coffee, rice, cassava, shea butter extract, kola nuts,  palm oil, and kernels grown nearby. A tea processing plant was built in Macenta in 1968, and the town has an agricultural research station, a sawmill, and several secondary schools. A trade in smuggling is believed to have developed in Macenta. Tigui Mining Company, which specialises in gold and diamond extraction and is owned by former model Tigui Camara, has licenses to work on diamond extraction in the locality.

The town is served by Macenta Airport.

Hospitals 
 Hôpital Préfectoral de Macenta
 Centre Medical Mission Phil Africaine
 Centre de Santé Bowa
 Centre de Santé de Patrice

Schools 
 Collège de Tripo Cabar
 l'École Patrice Lumumba
 Ecole primaire de Kamandou Koura

Districts 
Kamandou Koura
Kamandou Cite
Bowa 1
Bowa 2
Bamala

References

Sub-prefectures of the Nzérékoré Region